Wang Po-chieh (born 25 September 1989) is a Taiwanese actor. Known for his roles in both film and television, he has won a Taipei Film Award and been nominated for a Hundred Flowers Award and two Golden Bell Awards.

Career
Wang debuted in 2006, starring in a Cyndi Wang music video. He won the Award for Best New Talent at the 2008 Taipei Film Awards for his performance in Winds of September.

Filmography

Film

Television series

Awards and nominations

References

External links

 
 
 
 
 

1989 births
Living people
Male actors from Taipei
Taiwanese male film actors
Taiwanese male television actors
21st-century Taiwanese male actors